Abraham Klauber (January 24, 1831 in Zdeslav, Bohemia – July 23, 1911 in San Diego, California) was an American entrepreneur.

Life
was the grandson of Rabbi Moses Klauber, and the son of Jacob and Elizabeth Klauber. Abraham's father died of cholera in 1844, leaving 13-year-old Abraham as the sole support for both his mother and younger sister Mary. He immediately went to work for a merchant named Mandlebaum, as a clerk in his grocery. As a young man he learned the merchandising business, but by the time he was nineteen, he had heard the tales of California's gold rush and of freedom in America. In 1850 he left his homeland to make his fortune in the New World.
In 1850 from Bremerhaven Germany, Abraham took the sailing ship (Ocean Queen) to New Orleans. On arriving he then took a steamboat to St. Louis, where he went to work for Herman Levi. After a short time he moved on to Ottawa, Illinois, where he worked for Francis Mandlebaum, soon the two men became business partners. In 1852 the two left for New York, setting sail for the gold mines of California via the Isthmus of Nicaragua. The harrowing trip across the Nicaraguan Isthmus was plagued with much sickness and death. It was during the crossing that young Abe contracted yellow fever, which he survived. On arriving in San Francisco in July 1852, Abraham traveled again up river to Sacramento where he and his partner Francis Mandlebaum started a small clothing and general store. Abraham was witness to the great fire and flood of Sacramento on November 2, 1852. After rebuilding their store, Abraham moved to Volcano, California, setting up a branch store called "The Sacramento Store, Abraham Klauber & Co." Abraham and Francis married two sisters Louisa and Theresa Epstein who were also originally from Bohemia. Francis and Abraham were joined later in their business enterprises by brothers-in-law Morris and Henry Epstein who would be elected as a state legislator representing Douglas County for the first Organization of the State of Nevada.

The store in Volcano did very well during the Gold Rush, and soon Abraham opened another group of stores over the Sierra in Genoa Nevada Territory. The Genoa store was to play a key role in the history of Nevada. During his years in Nevada (1859–1868) he opened branch stores in Dayton, Carson City and Virginia City Nevada. Abraham provided his stores with goods by trucking supplies via mule train and wagon across the Sierra Mountains. Abraham's store in Genoa was used by Wells Fargo to conduct its business. The company's agents, Abraham and Henry Epstein, also became local agents for the Pony Express. The Pony Express was an important link with the outside world. It was a lifeline of information for the local papers that brought in the latest news and reports on the festering slave question in the East. The communications were even more important during this period since the country was leading up to the start of the Civil War.

Abraham became a U.S. Citizen on March 12, 1859, using money he had earned from his business enterprises, he soon sent for both his mother and sister in Bohemia. After having three children, Abraham began to tire of the hard mountain life, the Comstock mines had begun to slow production and the establishment of the transcontinental railroad began to negatively affect his Nevada Business. Abraham soon began to look for another place to live. In 1869, he chose San Diego as the place where he would move his enterprises. It was in San Diego where he created his new business in an area called "New Town," purchasing a lot from the "Father of San Diego" Alonzo Horton. For the next 40 years he would grow both his family & business enterprises starting with Steiner & Klauber, Klauber & Levi and then finally the very successful wholesale food distribution firm of Klauber Wangenheim Co. Abraham and Theresa would raise 9 of their 12 children to adults. Abraham's youngest son Laurence Monroe Klauber (1883 in San Diego, California – 1968), was an American herpetologist, and was considered to be the foremost authority on rattlesnakes. In 1877, Abraham ran for and was elected with 756 votes to serve with D.R. Foss and E. Ormsby on San Diego's Board of Supervisors, serving as its chairman 1878–80. The much revered 80-year-old pioneer and adventurer passed to his final rest on July 23, 1911. Acquaintances declared that his death marked the passing of one of the gentlest and most loved characters the southland had ever known.

There is still a Klauber Avenue to the southeast of City Heights, the neighborhood Klauber was instrumental in founding. In City Heights itself, Klauber Street was renamed to Wightman, but the old name can still be seen engraved in the sidewalk in some places, as it is a custom in San Diego to preserve the original markings when repaving the sidewalks. Klauber/Wightman St. is one block south of University Ave, which was originally named after Klauber's partner Steiner.

References

1831 births
1911 deaths
19th-century Czech people
1860s in the United States
People of the California Gold Rush
People of the American Old West
Wells Fargo
Nevada Territory
Austro-Hungarian emigrants to the United States
American people of Czech-Jewish descent
People from Klatovy District